Slavičky is a municipality and village in Třebíč District in the Vysočina Region of the Czech Republic. It has about 300 inhabitants.

Administrative parts
Villages of Okrašovice and Pozďátky are administrative parts of Slavičky.

History
The first written mention of Slavičky is from 1556. Okrašovice and Pozďátky were first documented in 1101.

References

Villages in Třebíč District